Logoniégué Forest is a protected forest in Burkina Faso. 
It is located in Comoé Province.

Protected areas of Burkina Faso
Comoé Province